Pat McGrath may refer to:

 Pat McGrath (make-up artist) (born 1965), British make-up artist
 Pat McGrath (Tipperary hurler) (born 1961), Irish sportsperson
 Pat McGrath (Waterford hurler) (born 1953), Irish hurler
 Pat McGrath (journalist) (born 1975), Irish journalist

See also
Patrick McGrath (disambiguation)